Gorislovo is a rural locality (a selo) in Starodubsky District, Bryansk Oblast, Russia. The population was 29 as of 2010. There are 7 streets.

Geography 
Gorislovo is located 11 km northeast of Starodub (the district's administrative centre) by road. Nevstruyevo is the nearest rural locality.

References 

Rural localities in Starodubsky District